= Civil Defence Training Institute =

Civil defence training institute in Kerala, India

Civil Defence Training Institute is a disaster management institute situated in the City of Thrissur in Kerala state of India. The institute is set up for giving training in disaster management for officials and civilians across Kerala. The institute is set up in eight acres of land and will have lecture halls, hostels and library facilities.
